Thomas Heberer (born 1947) is German Sinologist and political scientist.

Thomas Heberer may also refer to:

 Thomas Heberer (musician) (born 1965), German trumpeter